Milagros Coromoto Mendoza Díaz (born 11 December 1987) is a Venezuelan footballer who plays as a centre back for Yaracuyanos FC and the Venezuela women's national team.

International career
Mendoza played for Venezuela at senior level in two Copa América Femenina editions (2006 and 2014).

References

1987 births
Living people
People from Yaracuy
Venezuelan women's footballers
Women's association football central defenders
Women's association football midfielders
Unión Magdalena footballers
Yaracuyanos FC players
Venezuela women's international footballers
Venezuelan expatriate women's footballers
Venezuelan expatriate sportspeople in Colombia
Expatriate women's footballers in Colombia
Venezuelan expatriate sportspeople in Brazil
Expatriate women's footballers in Brazil